Gary Thompson is a retired American basketball player and broadcaster.  He was an All-American player at Iowa State.  Following his collegiate career, Thompson played for the Phillips 66ers of the Amateur Athletic Union and had a successful career as a broadcaster.

Playing career

Known as the "Roland Rocket", Gary Thompson came to Iowa State University from the small town of Roland, Iowa to become one of the Cyclones' first cage stars.  A 5'10 guard, Thompson was the first Iowa State player to score more than 1,000 points and the first player in school history to tally 40 points in a game.  As a senior in 1956–57, Thompson earned consensus second team  All-American honors, first team All-America status from the Associated Press, and was named Big Seven Conference player of the year, beating out Kansas star Wilt Chamberlain.  Thompson excelled in a second sport as well, leading Iowa State to the 1957 College World Series as a star shortstop.

Following the close of his standout college career, Thompson chose to join the Bartlesville Phillips 66ers of the Amateur Athletic Union, though he was also drafted in the fifth round of the 1957 NBA draft by the Minneapolis Lakers.  Thompson had a successful career with the 66ers, earning AAU All-America honors three times and leading Phillips to an AAU title in 1962.  He later coached the 66ers as well.

Post-playing career

After his playing days were over, Thompson began the Gary Thompson Oil Company, a business venture made possible by his affiliation with the Phillips Petroleum Company.  He also embarked on a 34-year television broadcasting career – serving as color commentator for college basketball games on NBC and CBS, primarily for Big Eight and later Big 12 games.  He retired in 2006.

References

External links
Iowa State Athletic HOF profile

Living people
All-American college men's basketball players
American men's basketball players
Basketball players at the 1959 Pan American Games
Basketball players from Iowa
College basketball announcers in the United States
Guards (basketball)
Iowa State Cyclones baseball players
Iowa State Cyclones men's basketball players
Minneapolis Lakers draft picks
Pan American Games gold medalists for the United States
People from Story County, Iowa
Phillips 66ers players
Pan American Games medalists in basketball
Year of birth missing (living people)
Medalists at the 1959 Pan American Games